Ghuman may refer to:
Ghumman (surname), people with this surname live both in India and Pakistan
Ghuman, Gujrat, a village in Pakistani Punjab
Ghuman, Gurdaspur, a village in Indian Punjab
Kapur Singh Ghuman, Indian writer and theatre actor
Varinder Singh Ghuman, Indian bodybuilder and wrestler
Muhammad Ilyas Ghuman, Pakistani cleric